Debahi  is a village development committee in Rautahat District in the Narayani Zone of the south-eastern Nepal. At the time of the 1991 Nepal census it had a population of 4560 people living in 905 individual households. The climate of Debahi is of Monsoon-influenced humid subtropical climate.

References

Populated places in Rautahat District